Araeovalva is a genus of moths in the family Gelechiidae.

Species
Araeovalva albiflora (Meyrick, 1920)
Araeovalva minor Janse, 1960

References

Gelechiini
Moth genera